Victoria Road may refer to:

Roads
 Victoria Road, Adelaide, Australia
 Victoria Road, Sydney, Australia
 Victoria Road, Cambridge, England
 Victoria Road, Oxford, England
 Victoria Road, Kensington, London, England
 Victoria Road, Hong Kong
 Kawartha Lakes Road 35, historically the Victoria Colonization Road, in Ontario

Other
 Victoria Road, Ontario, Canada, a village on the road listed above
 Victoria Road, Dagenham, a football stadium in Dagenham, England
 Victoria Road, Port Talbot, a football stadium in Wales

See also 

 Victoria Road Prison, Douglas, Isle of Man
 Victoria Trail, Edmonton, Canada